Elizabeth Rider is an English actress, sometimes credited as Liza Rider. She is known for her portrayal of Lynette Driver in the BBC soap opera Doctors.

Education 
Rider trained at the Guildhall School of Music and Drama, where she was awarded its Gold Medal. From there, she joined the Radio Drama Company by winning the Carlton Hobbs Bursary, which gave her a contract for six months.

Career
Rider's first television acting job was as Norah in the 1979 miniseries Testament of Youth. In 1997, she landed the role of Sheila Thwaite in The Lakes. In 1999, she appeared in ITV soap opera Coronation Street as Ashley Peacock's biological mother. In 2004, she had a ten-episode role playing Jill Green in EastEnders.

Rider appeared in Series Two and Three of the drama At Home with the Braithwaites in 2001 and 2002, as Helen Braithwaite. She also voiced Atris in the video game Star Wars Knights of the Old Republic II: The Sith Lords. She appeared in five episodes in Series 23 of the long-running medical drama series Casualty, playing troubled mum Cathy Malone. She has also appeared in Heartbeat, Emmerdale, Holby City, Hollyoaks, The Street, The Accused, The Tunnel, Call the Midwife, Marchlands, Informer and the 2013 Doctor Who Christmas Special, "The Time of the Doctor", among many other dramas. From 2009 to 2017, Rider portrayed the recurring role of DCI Lynette Driver on the BBC soap opera Doctors.

Filmography

Film

Television

Video games

References

External links
 

English soap opera actresses
Living people
English voice actresses
Year of birth missing (living people)
Place of birth missing (living people)